Neva Small is an American theatrical, film, and television actress and singer. She made her singing debut at the age of 10 at the New York City Opera, and her Broadway debut the following year. She has numerous acting credits on and Off-Broadway. She is best known for her portrayal of Chava, Tevye's third daughter and the one who marries a gentile, in the 1971 film Fiddler on the Roof.

Early life and education
Neva Small was born in New York City to Seldan and Berma Small. She grew up on Central Park West. Her mother graduated in the first class of harpists at Juilliard in 1938, and played in an all-female orchestra at the Waldorf Astoria.

Small began singing in an extracurricular after-school program, and acted in Hebrew school and in the Jewish Theater for Children, where she was an understudy for Don Scardino. At age 10, she played Beverly Sills' daughter in The Ballad of Baby Doe (1963) at the New York City Opera.

She studied at the LaGuardia High School of Music & Art and Performing Arts. She was accepted at the Juilliard drama school, but deferred her admission for a year in order to act in the 1971 film Fiddler on the Roof. She then studied at New York University's Gallatin School.

Theatrical career
Small made her Broadway debut in the 1964 musical Something More! Other early Broadway stage credits include The Impossible Years (1965–1967), Henry, Sweet Henry (1967), Frank Merriwell (1971), and Something's Afoot (1976).

Her early Off-Broadway performances include Ballad for a Firing Squad (1968) and Show Me Where the Good Times Are (1970). She turned down a part in Godspell to play the title character in F. Jasmine Addams, the first musical staged at Circle in the Square Theatre, in 1971. Based on the novel The Member of the Wedding by Carson McCullers, the one-act play was cancelled after six performances.

She also appeared in Leonard Bernstein's Mass (1971), Yentl the Yeshiva Boy (1974), Styne After Styne (1980), and a revised edition of Blues in the Night that toured the East Coast in the mid-1980s. In 1985–1986 she played in 277 performances of The Golden Land, a Jewish cultural revue, at the Second Avenue Theatre. In 1990, she appeared in Hannah...1939 at the Vineyard Theatre.

Fiddler on the Roof

Small made her film debut as Chava, the third of Tevye's five daughters, in the 1971 film adaptation of the long-running Broadway musical Fiddler on the Roof. Her character leaves the Jewish community to marry a gentile. While Small had wanted to audition for the original Broadway show, she was told by the play's producers that she "wasn't Jewish enough". She screen-tested for the characters of both Hodel and Chava, and won the latter role. Since she was under 18, she required a guardian during the filming; her older sister Gail assumed this role.

Later work
Small has continued to act and sing in musical productions. In 2007 she starred in the one-woman show Neva Small: Not Quite an Ingenue, a theatrical revue based on her musical career, at The Actors' Temple.

Her television credits include Law & Order, Law & Order: Criminal Intent, and The Hijacking of the Achille Lauro.

Small provides "edu-entertainment" for children at Jewish community centers, discussing the background of Sholem Aleichem's stories, Marc Chagall's paintings, and the Russian Jewish experience that inspired the Fiddler on the Roof story and film. She has also performed as a puppeteer.

Musical recordings
In 1966, at the age of 14, Small recorded four singles for the MGM Records label.

In 2004, Small recorded her only solo album, My Place in the World (Small Penny Enterprises Records). This compilation of melodies that she sang during her stage and film career is noted for including "many generally obscure show tunes".

Personal life
She and her late husband Dr. Frederic Fenig, a dermatologist, have two daughters. They resided in New York City.

References

Sources
 
 
 

 *

External links
 Official website
 
"Take Me Away With You" (1966 single)
"Shh, I'm Watching The Movie" (1966 single)
"Anecdotes from Anatevka: Joanna Merlin, Adrienne Barbeau, Alfred Molina, Neva Small, Pia Zadora, Cheryl Stern and More Recall Fiddler on the Roof" Playbill, September 22, 2014

1952 births
Living people
American women singers
American musical theatre actresses
American film actresses
American television actresses
Actresses from New York City
New York University Gallatin School of Individualized Study alumni
Fiorello H. LaGuardia High School alumni
Juilliard School alumni
21st-century American women